Prem Bhatia (17 January 1940 – 13 March 2018) was an Indian cricketer. He played 55 first-class matches for Delhi between 1958 and 1969, scoring more than 2,500 runs. Bhatia also made 1 first-class appearance for Gujarat against Baroda in the 1973–74 Ranji Trophy, while also making 1 List A appearance for North Zone against South Zone in the 1984–85 Deodhar Trophy.

He is perhaps best known by becoming the first twelfth man to bat in a first-class match, when asked to bat in place of former India captain Lala Amarnath in the first Irani Trophy match between the Rest of India and Bombay on 18 March 1960. Bhatia batted in both innings, scoring 22 in the first and 50 in the second, while Amarnath bowled and fielded.

See also
 List of Delhi cricketers
 List of Gujarat cricketers
 List of North Zone cricketers

References

External links
  - Main Cricinfo account
  - Showing his 1 appearance for Gujarat, CricketArchive confirms they are the same player

1940 births
2018 deaths
Indian cricketers
Delhi cricketers
Place of birth missing
Gujarat cricketers
North Zone cricketers
Cricketers from Delhi